Newark Beth Israel Medical Center (NBIMC), previously Newark Beth Israel Hospital, is a 665-bed quaternary care, teaching hospital located in Newark, New Jersey serving the healthcare needs for Newark and the Northern Jersey area. The hospital is owned by the RWJBarnabas Health System and is the third largest hospital in the system. NBIMC is affiliated with the New Jersey Medical School of Rutgers University and features over 100 residents. It has an adult and pediatric emergency department, but serious trauma is usually handled by the nearby University Hospital. Attached to the medical center is the Children's Hospital of New Jersey, which treats infants and young people up to age 21.

History 
The hospital was run under auspices of the Newark Jewish Community and its suburban successors from its inception in 1900-1901 until its purchase by RWJBarnabas Health in 1996.

In 2011, the Newark Beth Israel Medical Center was ranked among the top 50 hospitals in the United States for specialty care in cardiology and heart surgery. The following year, it remained highly ranked but was not in the top 50 hospitals nationwide.

Newark Beth Israel Medical Center is home to one of the nation's ten largest heart transplant centers, according to Becker's Hospital Review.

In 2020, the hospital was given an "A" by the Leapfrog Hospital Safety Grade.

In 2019 regulators found incidents in which the hospital put patients in "immediate jeopardy" following unsuccessful surgeries, and did not carry out its own recommendations, leading to mistakes on subsequent operations. Regulators also discovered instances hospital staff who failed to obtain informed consent or follow patients' and family members' "do not resuscitate" orders. Weeks later, Congressman Donald M. Payne, Jr. issued a statement about the corrective actions taken by the hospital, saying, "Based on my communications with the hospital, I believe the situation is moving in the right direction at this time and I will continue to monitor it."

In early 2020, the hospital suspended a staff member for distributing unauthorized protective gear after the staff member used GoFundMe to raise money to buy gowns and masks for hospital staff to use in dealing with Coronavirus disease 2019 patients.

In October 2020, the hospital began a $100 million project to expand and modernize the facility, including the emergency room, intensive care units, a new cardiac center and maternity unit.

Services 

 Cancer
 Heart and vascular care
 Men's health
 Mental health and behavioral health
 Neuroscience
 Orthopedics
 Pediatrics
 Senior health
 Transplant services
 Weight loss and Bariatric surgery
 Wellness
 Women's health

See also 

 RWJBarnabas Health
 New Jersey Medical School

References

External links 
 Children's Hospital of New Jersey
 Newark Beth Israel Medic 
al Center

Coordinates on Wikidata
Hospital buildings completed in 1901
Buildings and structures in Newark, New Jersey
Hospitals in New Jersey
Jews and Judaism in Newark, New Jersey
Organizations established in 1900
1900 establishments in New Jersey
Children's hospitals in New Jersey